Monaco (MON) competed at the 2005 Mediterranean Games in Almería, Spain. The nation had a total number of 16 participants (15 men and 1 woman).

Results by event

See also
 Monaco at the 2004 Summer Olympics
 Monaco at the 2008 Summer Olympics

References
 Official Site

Nations at the 2005 Mediterranean Games
2005
Mediterranean Games